is a Japanese footballer currently playing as a goalkeeper for Omiya Ardija of J2 League.

Career statistics

Club
.

Notes

References

External links

1997 births
Living people
Japanese footballers
Association football goalkeepers
J1 League players
J2 League players
J3 League players
Omiya Ardija players
Giravanz Kitakyushu players